Ranjib Biswal (born 21 September 1970) is a former Indian cricketer and the former Chairman of Indian Premier League. He played domestic cricket for the Odisha and represented India in Under-19 cricket, Captaining the side against Pakistan in four test matches played in India.

After retiring from domestic cricket in 1997, Biswal has become an administrator and was made a member of the selection committee (representing East Zone) in 2005 under Kiran More. In 2006, when the committee was re-formed under Dilip Vengsarkar, Ranjib Biswal was retained for an additional term in 2006.

In 2006, Shri Ranjib Biswal was entrusted with the additional responsibility of Manager with D Dongoankar for the IND tour of WI - 2006. He was also held the position of  Chairman National Cricket Academy (NCA) and President of Odisha Cricket Association (OCA). He was the member and Team Manager of the 2011 World Cup and the 2013 Champions Trophy winning, Indian Cricket Team. Later in September 2013, Shri Ranjib Biswal elevated as the Chairman of IPL and he held the post till April 2015. In January 2017, he stepped down from the post of OCA President.

In 3 April 2014 to 2 April 2020, Shri Ranjib Biswal (Congress) elected as Rajya Sabha MP from Odisha. He chaired various Parliamentary Committee during his tenure.

Personal life
Ranjib Biswal is the son of the Odisha politician - the late Basant Kumar Biswal, Ex-Deputy CM, Odisha.

His elder brother Shri Chiranjib Biswal also a former Congress MLA from Jagatsinghpur constituency.

Ranjib Biswal is married to Anita Mohanty, a NRI from Manchester, United Kingdom

Political Positions Held

 Member of Parliament, Rajya Sabha, Odisha
 Member of Standing Committee on Coal and Steel.
 Former Member of Consultative Committee on Petroleum and Natural Gas.
 Member of Telecom Authority Committee, Bhubaneswar Circle.
 Member of parliament for 11th and 12th Lok Sabha
 Member of standing committee for Science & Technology, Environment & Forest
 Member of consultative committee for Coal
 Member of Speaker's delegation to Russia
 Member to represent India at international Parliamentarian Union in Brussels as a member of Parliament
 Member of TAC & ZRUC
 Visited USA under USAI programme as a parliament member from India
 Treasurer of Indian Youth Congress
 General Secretary of Indian Youth Congress
 President of Orissa Pradesh Youth Congress
 AICC Member

Sports Position Held

 President, Orissa Cricket Association
 Chairman, Indian Premier League
 Member, Indian Premier League Governing Council
 Manager, Indian Cricket Team, CWC 2011 and CT 2013
 Member, Finance, Marketing and Corporate Cricket, BCCI
 Member, Technical Committee, BCCI
 Senior Selector, Indian Cricket Team, BCCI
 National Selector, National Cricket Academy, BCCI
 Captain, Under -19 Indian Cricket Team, for Tour to Pakistan, Asia Cup, Australia and New-Zealand.
 Captain, Orissa Ranji Trophy
 Played Duleep and Deodhar Trophy for East Zone
 Played WILLS trophy for Board President XI & WILLS XI

Other Position Held
 Former Managing Editor of a leading Oriya Daily Newspaper named "The Samaya" and "Samaya Saptahik" in Orissa
 Worked as an Executive with SAIL

Education 
 Post Graduate, St. Stephens College, New Delhi. , 
 Stewart School, Cuttack

References

External links
 Cricinfo Website - Player Page

1970 births
Living people
Odisha cricketers
Indian cricketers
Cricket managers
India national cricket team selectors
Cricketers from Odisha
East Zone cricketers
Indian sports executives and administrators
Indian cricket administrators
Rajya Sabha members from Odisha
People from Jagatsinghpur district
People from Cuttack
Indian National Congress politicians
India MPs 1996–1997
India MPs 1998–1999
Lok Sabha members from Odisha